Miss Universe 1987, the 36th Miss Universe pageant, was held on 27 May 1987 at the World Trade Centre in Singapore. Bárbara Palacios of Venezuela crowned her successor Cecilia Bolocco of Chile. 68 contestants competed in the pageant.

Results

Placements

Final Competition

Contestants

  - Carolina Brachetti
  - Jennine Leonarder
  - Kristina Sebestyen
  - Betty Ann Hanna
  - Dawn Michelle Waithe
  - Holly Emma Edgell
  - Patricia Arce
  - Jacqueline Meirelles
  - Sandy Michelle Harrigan
  - Tina May Simpson
  - Cecilia Bolocco
  - Patricia López Ruiz
  - Ana María Bolaños
  - Viennaline Arvelo
  - Natasha Papademetriou
  - Nanna Louisa Johansson
  - Carmen Rita Pérez
  - María del Pilar Barreiro Cucalón
  - Hoda Abboud
  - Virna Passely Machuca
  - Yvette Dawn Lindsey
  - Outi Tanhuanpää
  - Nathalie Marquay
  - Dagmar Schulz
  - Xenia Pantazi
  - Susse Petersen
  - Teresa Torres Fischer
  - María Isabel Flores 
  - Janny Tervelde
  - Francia Tatiana Reyes
  - Lily Chong Sok Hui
  - Priyadarshini Pradhan
  - Rosemary Thompson
  - Yamit Noy
  - Roberta Capua
  - Janice Sewell
  - Hiroe Namba
  - Susan Waruguru Kahumba
  - Kim Ji-eun
  - Sahar Mouhsen Haydar
  - Christine Praglar
  - Kristina Apap Bologna
  - Cynthia Fallon
  - Ursula Kim Ryan
  - Lynda Chuba-Ikpeazu
  - Luciana Seman Ada
  - Mariann Leines
  - Gabriela Deleuze Ducasa
  - Tammy Elizabeth Ortigoza
  - Jessica Newton Saez
  - Geraldine Edith Villarruz Asis
  - Noelia Chávez Pereira
  - Laurie Simpson
  - Fabienne Joelle Feliho
  - Marion Nicole Teo
  - Remedios Cervantes
  - Nandaine Wijiegooneratna
  - Suzanne Thörngren
  - Renate Walther
  - Chutima Naiyana
  - Sheree Ann Denise Richards
  - Leyle Sesbet
  - Carmelita Louise Ariza
  - María Victoria Zangaro Groso
  - Michelle Royer
  - Felize Bencosme
  - Inés María Calero
  - Nicola Gail Davies

Notes

Debuts

Returns

Last competed in 1964:
 
Last competed in 1985:

Withdrawals

 
 
 
 
 
 
 
 
 
 
  – Eileen Catterson was underage before February 1.
  – participated in Miss France since then.
 
  – Mesatewa Tuzolana

Did not compete
  – Shelley Bascombe was overage, hence disqualified.

Awards
  – Miss Amity (Francia Tatiana Reyes)
  – Miss Photogenic (Patricia López Ruiz)
  – Best National Costume (Jacqueline Meirelles)

General references

1987
1987 in Singapore
1987 beauty pageants
Beauty pageants in Singapore
May 1987 events in Asia